Perivale Halt railway station was a station on the New North Main Line of the Great Western Railway. It served the London suburb of Perivale from 1904 to 1947, when it was replaced by Perivale station on the Central line of the London Underground.

History
The station was opened by the Great Western Railway (GWR) on 1 May 1904, originally being named Perivale. It had long wooden platforms, and pagoda huts, on an embankment reached by sloping paths west of Horsenden Lane South. The steam "push-and-pull" passenger service ran to Paddington (Bishop's Road), the line was shared with freight, and express trains to Birmingham (2 hours, non-stop). Until the late 1920s, Perivale was entirely rural, despite its proximity to Ealing. A similar halt was at  before it was modernised by Network SouthEast.

The station closed temporarily on 1 February 1915, reopening on 29 March 1920; and on 10 July 1922 was renamed Perivale Halt. It closed permanently on 15 June 1947, in advance of the opening of the extension of the Central line from North Acton to Greenford on 30 June 1947.

See also
List of closed railway stations in London

References

Further reading
 - shows a Lens of Sutton photograph of the station

External links
Perivale Halt on navigable 1945 O.S. map

Former Great Western Railway stations
Disused railway stations in the London Borough of Ealing
Railway stations in Great Britain opened in 1904
Railway stations in Great Britain closed in 1915
Railway stations in Great Britain opened in 1920
Railway stations in Great Britain closed in 1947
Perivale